The 2011 Dragon World Championships were held in Melbourne, Australia between 9 and 15 January 2011. The hosting yacht club was Royal Brighton Yacht Club.

Results

References

Dragon World Championships
Dragon World Championship
Sailing competitions in Australia
2011 in Australian sport
January 2011 sports events in Australia